Walter Charles "Wally" Anderzunas (January 11, 1946 – May 28, 1989) was an American basketball player.

He attended high school in Omaha, Nebraska and collegiately for the Creighton University.

He was selected by the Detroit Pistons in the sixth round (70th pick overall) of the 1968 NBA draft and by the Atlanta Hawks in the second round (25th pick overall) of the 1969 NBA draft.

He played for the Cincinnati Royals (1969–1970) in the National Basketball Association (NBA) for 44 games.

References

1946 births
1989 deaths
Atlanta Hawks draft picks
American people of Lithuanian descent
Basketball players from Nebraska
Centers (basketball)
Cincinnati Royals players
Creighton Bluejays men's basketball players
Detroit Pistons draft picks
Power forwards (basketball)
Sportspeople from Omaha, Nebraska
American men's basketball players